The kobold is a sprite in Germanic mythology.

Kobold may also refer to:
Hermann Kobold (1858–1942), a German astronomer
Kobold (Dungeons & Dragons), a fictional species in Dungeons & Dragons
Kobold (Shannara), an elf character in Shannara
Kobold Quarterly, a roleplaying game magazine

See also
Kobolds Ate My Baby!, a role-playing game from 9th Level Games